The twelfth season of RuPaul's Drag Race premiered on February 28 and concluded on May 29, 2020. The competition was broadcast on VH1 in the United States and saw 13 new queens competing for the title of "America's Next Drag Superstar". VH1 renewed both RuPaul's Drag Race and its spin-off RuPaul's Drag Race All Stars for a twelfth and fifth season respectively on August 19, 2019. At the time of the renewal the Drag Race franchise had earned VH1 a total of 14 Emmy nominations. Casting calls were opened in January 2019 while the cast was revealed by season 11 winner Yvie Oddly on January 23, 2020. 

Following multiple revelations of misconduct, Sherry Pie was disqualified from the show and mostly edited out of the American broadcast, although initial overseas screenings retained the original edit. 

Due to the ongoing COVID-19 pandemic, the reunion and finale were held virtually across the country.

The winner of the twelfth season of RuPaul's Drag Race was Jaida Essence Hall, with Crystal Methyd and Gigi Goode being the runners-up, and Heidi N Closet being Miss Congeniality. The Halloween variety show Bring Back My Ghouls, hosted by Essence Hall and featuring season 12 contestants, was broadcast on WOWPresents on October 30, 2020.

Contestants

Ages, names, and cities stated are at time of filming.

Contestant progress

Lip syncs
Legend:

Guest judges
Listed in chronological order:

Nicki Minaj, rapper
Robyn, singer
Thandiwe Newton, actress
Olivia Munn, actress
Leslie Jones, comedian and actress
Normani, singer
Daniel Franzese, actor
Jonathan Bennett, actor and television host
Alexandria Ocasio-Cortez, congresswoman
Winnie Harlow, model
Chaka Khan, singer
Jeff Goldblum, actor
Rachel Bloom, actress
Daisy Ridley, actress
Whoopi Goldberg, actress and television personality
Jamal Sims, choreographer

Special guests
Guests who appeared in episodes, but did not judge on the main stage.

Episode 1
Kimora Blac, contestant on Season 9 (impersonating Kim Kardashian)
Mayhem Miller, contestant on Season 10 (impersonating Kanye West)
Raven, runner-up of Season 2 and of All Stars Season 1
The Vivienne, winner of RuPaul's Drag Race UK Series 1 (impersonating Donald Trump)

Episode 2
Kim Chi, runner up of Season 8 (impersonating Anna Sui)
Mayhem Miller, contestant on Season 10 (impersonating Andre Leon Talley)
Raven, runner-up of Season 2 and of All Stars Season 1
Sonique, contestant on Season 2 (impersonating Karl Lagerfeld)
Zaldy, fashion designer

Episode 3
Charo, actress, singer, classical guitarist, comedian
Vivacious, contestant on Season 6

Episode 6
Vanessa Vanjie Mateo, contestant on Season 10 and Season 11

Episode 7
David Benjamin Steinberg, record producer
Erik Paparozzi, record producer
Jamal Sims, choreographer

Episode 8
Bob Harper, personal trainer and author

Episode 9
Raven, runner-up of Season 2 and of All Stars Season 1

Episode 13
Victoria "Porkchop" Parker, contestant on Season 1
Vanessa Vanjie Mateo, contestant on Season 10 and Season 11
Lisa Rinna, reality television personality
Harry Hamlin, actor

Episode 14
Rachel Bloom, actor and comedian
Bob the Drag Queen, winner of season eight
Monét X Change, contestant on season ten and winner of All Stars 4
Adore Delano, contestant on season six and All Stars season two
Bianca Del Rio, winner of season six
Scarlet Envy, contestant on season eleven
Daniel Franzese, actor
Whoopi Goldberg, actress and comedian
Adam Lambert, singer
Vanessa Vanjie Mateo, contestant on seasons ten and eleven
Dolly Parton, singer
Peppermint, runner-up of season nine
Kim Petras, singer
Robyn, singer
Latrice Royale, contestant on season four and All Stars one and four
Yvie Oddly, winner of season eleven
Sasha Velour, winner of season nine
Vivacious, contestant on season six
Nina West, contestant on season eleven

Episodes

Disqualification 

On March 4, 2020, Ben Shimkus, a 25-year-old actor, posted an update to Facebook detailing his experiences with the contestant, whose real name is Joey Gugliemelli, and accusing him of catfishing when the two studied together in the musical theater program at SUNY Cortland. Shimkus' post alleged that Gugliemelli deceived him using a fake identity of "Allison Mossey" to make promises of a musical career on Broadway. Shimkus also claimed that Gugliemelli coerced him into sending sexually suggestive fetish videos as part of the audition process.

In these videos, Shimkus was asked to play the character of Jeff, a steroid-dependent individual obsessed with growing muscle and gaining physical strength. In the script provided by Gugliemelli, Shimkus explained, the character of Jeff was supposed to appear ostensibly pleased with his body odor that resulted from taking steroids.

In an article with BuzzFeed News published on March 5, 2020, four other men came forward with similar allegations of Gugliemelli posing as Mossey and leading them to believe that recording sexually daring audition videos would increase their chances of being noticed by casting directors.

Another former classmate at SUNY Cortland alleged that Gugliemelli similarly deceived him to film various provocative scenes wearing revealing clothing as part of his audition for a musical production of The Nightmare Before Christmas, which he was told was affiliated with the director Tim Burton. One victim claimed that Gugliemelli had explicitly asked them to masturbate on camera. As of March 6, 2020, a total of seven victims of Gugliemelli's alleged misconduct have come forward.

Gugliemelli posted an apology on his Facebook page, staying that he was sorry for "[causing] such trauma and pain" and that he had been "seeking help and receiving treatment since coming back to NYC". On March 6, 2020, VH1 released a statement regarding the incident, and made the decision to disqualify Gugliemelli from the contest. According to the statement, the season would air as planned but Gugliemelli would not appear in the live finale.  After both episodes 3 and 5, wherein Sherry Pie won the challenge and received $5,000 cash tips, World of Wonder donated $5,000 to The Trevor Project.

The contestant was originally one of the Top 4 queens, alongside Gigi Goode, Crystal Methyd and Jaida Essence Hall but due to her disqualification, she finished in 4th place, resulting in Season 12 being the first to feature a top 3 since Season 8.

Bring Back My Ghouls 
Bring Back My Ghouls was a Halloween variety special presented by World of Wonder, which streamed on the company's YouTube channel and WOW Presents Plus subscription service on October 30, 2020. The broadcast saw the season 12 contestants performing lip-syncs and participating in interviews. RuPaul also appears with a "special message". Viewers could submit requests and send tips via Cash App, PayPal, or Venmo, which were split evenly between the performers. Participants lip-synced to the songs "Bring Back My Ghouls" and "I'm That Witch" and wore Halloween-inspired costumes. Gigi Goode appeared as Tippi Hedren in Alfred Hitchcock's 1963 film The Birds, Rock M. Sakura dressed as a squid, and Widow Von'Du dressed as the Wicked Witch of the West, a fictional character in L. Frank Baum's children's novel The Wonderful Wizard of Oz (1900) and subsequent adaptations. Season 12 winner Jaida Essence Hall spoke with fellow contestants about their Halloween plans. The "Time to Vote" segment was a collaboration with Crooked Media and Vote Save America and saw Brita and Heidi N Closet emphasize the importance of voting in the 2020 United States elections in a parody of the music video for RuPaul's song "Peanut Butter".

Ratings

References

2020 American television seasons
Impact of the COVID-19 pandemic on the LGBT community
RuPaul's Drag Race seasons
Television series impacted by the COVID-19 pandemic
2020 in LGBT history